Bersujud Airport  is an airport in Batu Licin, South Kalimantan, Indonesia.

Airlines and destinations

Statistics

References

Airports in South Kalimantan